Paradise is the third release, by the Christian third-wave ska band, The Insyderz. Released in 1998, paradise is the band's only CD single. The song "Our Wars" contains numerous references to Star Wars, and "Just What I Needed" is a cover of The Cars song.

Track listing 
 "Paradise"
 "Our Wars"
 "Just What I Needed"
 "Our Wars" (Dark Fader mix)
 "Paradise" (Karaoke mix)

References

The Insyderz albums
1998 EPs